George Fowler High School (Public Service Leadership Academy) is a high school located at 227 Magnolia Street in Syracuse, New York, part of the Syracuse City School District.  The acting principal is Magaret Mcroubie - Taru.

References

Public high schools in New York (state)
Syracuse City School District